Moniot d'Arras (fl. 1213–1239) was a French composer and poet of the trouvère tradition. He was a monk ("Moniot" is a diminutive for monk) of the abbey of Arras in northern France; the area was at the time a center of trouvère activity, and his contemporaries included Adam de la Halle and Colin Muset.  His songs were all monophonic in the tradition of pastoral romance and courtly love; he also wrote religious songs.  About fifteen of his secular songs, and two religious songs, survive; his most famous song is "Ce fut en mai".

References

13th-century Christian monks
13th-century French composers
Medieval male composers
French male classical composers
French classical composers
Trouvères
French Christian monks